Erythrobacter is a Gram-negative and rod-shaped bacteria genus from the family Erythrobacteraceae.

Species
Erythrobacter comprises the followings species:
 Erythrobacter alti Yoon 2020

 "Erythrobacter aureus" Tang et al. 2019

 Erythrobacter colymbi (Furuhata et al. 2013) Xu et al. 2020
 Erythrobacter cryptus (da Costa et al. 2003) Xu et al. 2020
 Erythrobacter dokdonensis (Yoon et al. 2006) Xu et al. 2020
 Erythrobacter donghaensis (Yoon et al. 2004) Xu et al. 2020

 Erythrobacter insulae Park et al. 2020

 Erythrobacter litoralis Yurkov et al. 1994
 Erythrobacter longus Shiba and Simidu 1982

 "Erythrobacter mangrovi" Ye et al. 2020

 "Erythrobacter nanhaiensis" Chen et al. 2019

 Erythrobacter neustonensis (Fuerst et al. 1993) Xu et al. 2020

 Erythrobacter ramosus (Yurkov et al. 1994) Xu et al. 2020
 Erythrobacter sanguineus (Hiraishi et al. 2002) Xu et al. 2020

 "Erythrobacter tepidarius" (Hanada et al. 1997) Xu et al. 2020

 "Erythrobacter westpacificensis" Wei et al. 2013

References

Further reading

External links
 Erythrobacter at MicrobeWiki

Sphingomonadales
Bacteria genera